Boubacar is both a surname and a given name, which is a West African variant of Abu Bakr.

Surname:
Sarr Boubacar (born 1951), Senegalese footballer
Sidi Mohamed Ould Boubacar (born 1957), Mauritanian politician and Prime Minister of Mauritania

Given name:
Boubacar Barry (born 1979), Ivorian footballer
Boubacar Bagili (born 1994), Mauritanian footballer
Boubacar Coulibaly (born 1978), Malian footballer
Boubacar Dembélé (born 1982), French footballer
Boubacar Dialiba (born 1988), Senegalese footballer
Boubacar Diallo (filmmaker), Burkinabé film director
Boubacar Diallo (footballer) (born 1985), Guinean footballer
Boubacar Diarra (footballer, born 1979), Malian footballer
Boubacar Diarra (footballer, born 1994), Malian footballer
Boubacar Boris Diop (born 1946), Senegalese writer and journalist
Boubacar Kamara (born 1999) French footballer 
Boubacar Kébé (born 1987), Burkinabé-Malian footballer
Boubacar Keita (born 1984), Guinean-born Nigerian footballer
Boubacar Koné (born 1984), Malian footballer
Boubacar Mansaly (born 1988), Senegalese footballer
Boubacar Sanogo (born 1982), Ivorian footballer
Boubacar Sylla (born 1991), Malian footballer
Boubacar Talatou (born 1987), Nigerien footballer
Boubacar Traoré (musician) (born 1942), Malian musician
Boubacar Traore (runner) (born 1971) Guinean activist and Paralympic athlete